Trinity Church of England High School, also known as Trinity CE High School, is an academy school located in Hulme, Manchester, North West. The headteacher is Julian Nicholls. The school is in between Higher Cambridge Street and Boundary Lane near the   University of Manchester on the Oxford Road campus.

The school was formed in 1984 on the closure of Bishop Greer and Fallowfield Church of England High Schools. A substantial rebuilding project was completed in 2011 (£21million), with the new building fronting Higher Cambridge Street, which expanded the school. In 2014, the school announced a £4 million project to create a sixth form centre on site. Work began in the Summer of 2014, with the first intake in September 2016.

The school takes in pupils from Manchester and surrounding areas. The school's motto is 'Faith in the City, Value in People, Excellence in Education.' The school holds Technology College status and has been designated a Leading Edge School.

Notable alumni include Tina O'Brien, Coronation Street actress; Danny Welbeck, Watford F.C. footballer; Luke Matheson, Wolverhampton Wanderers ; actress Wunmi Mosaku; singer Misha B and journalist and author Keir Thomas.

External links
Trinity C of E High School Website
 Ofsted School Profile
 Government School Performance Tables

Church of England secondary schools in the Diocese of Manchester
Secondary schools in Manchester
Academies in Manchester